Gary Don McDermott (born June 9, 1946) is a former American football running back in the American Football League and National Football League who played for the Buffalo Bills and Atlanta Falcons. He played college football for the Tulsa Golden Hurricane.

References

1946 births
Living people
American football running backs
Buffalo Bills players
Atlanta Falcons players
Tulsa Golden Hurricane football players
Judson High School alumni